Dionysios Mantoukas (1648–1751) was the Greek Orthodox bishop of Kastoria, Western Macedonia, modern Greece, from 1694 to 1719. Mantoukas was born in the town of Moscopole, now in modern southeast Albania, in 1648. He was an ethnic Aromanian.

References

Bishops of the Ecumenical Patriarchate of Constantinople
People from Moscopole
Aromanians from the Ottoman Empire
1648 births
1751 deaths
17th-century Greek Orthodox bishops